Derek Bond is a retired British rower who competed for Great Britain.

Rowing career
Bond was part of the coxless four that finished 10th overall and 4th in the B final at the 1977 World Rowing Championships in Amsterdam.

References

Living people
British male rowers
Year of birth missing (living people)